Swarnali Dey, known popularly by her screen name Riya Dey is an Indian actress, model and television personality known for her work in Odia films. Her numerous accolades include an Odisha State Film Award for Prema Adhei Akhyara.

Filmography

References

External links

Living people
Ollywood
Actresses in Odia cinema
People from Balasore
Year of birth missing (living people)